Douglas Falconer may refer to:

Doug Falconer (Canadian football) (1952–2021), Canadian professional football player
Douglas Scott Falconer (1913–2004), British geneticist 
Douglas Falconer (judge) (1914–2007), British judge